Mid Kerry is one of the divisions of Kerry Gaelic Athletic Association. It organizes Gaelic football and hurling competitions for the clubs within the division and fields teams in county competitions. The division is based around the town of Killorglin and neighbouring parishes.  The division was created in 1947 when Laune Rangers, Castlemaine, Milltown, Tuogh, Glenbeigh and Beaufort broke away from the East Kerry division to create their own competitions.

Honours
 Kerry Senior Football Championship
 Winners (4) 1967, 1971, 1992, 2008
 Runners-Up (9) 1965, 1972, 1975, 1978, 1990, 2011, 2014, 2020, 2022
 Kerry Under-21 Football Championship
 Winners (3) 1981, 2000, 2013
 Runners-Up (2) 2002, 2004
 Kerry Minor Football Championship
 Winners (5) 1960, 1997, 1998, 2002, 2003
 Runners-Up (6) 1962, 2000, 2011, 2015, 2017, 2021

Member clubs
 Beaufort
 Cromane
 Glenbeigh-Glencar
 Keel
 Laune Rangers
 Milltown/Castlemaine

Competitions
The main competition run by the division is the Mid Kerry Senior Football Championship.

Notable players
 Peter Crowley
 Donnchadh Walsh
 Darren O'Sullivan
 Dan Doona
 Pat Griffin
 Brendan Lynch
 Paudie Lynch
 Aidan O'Shea
 Seán O'Sullivan
 Tom Prendergast

References

Divisional boards of Kerry GAA
Gaelic games clubs in County Kerry